In the 2011-12 season, Al-Quwa Al-Jawiya will be competing in the 2011-12 Iraqi Premier League.

Current squad

Transfers

In

Out

Matches

Competitive

Iraqi Premier League

External links
 Goalzz
 Team players
 Iraqi League

Al-Quwa Al-Jawiya
Iraqi football club seasons